Robert Marteau (February 8, 1925 in Virollet, Poitou – May 16, 2011 in Paris) was a French poet, novelist, translator, essayist, diarist.

Life
In 1972 he moved to Montreal to live with his girlfriend. He remained twelve years, and opt for Canadian citizenship. He then resided in Paris.
He was awarded the 2003 Charles Vildrac from the Société des Gens de Lettres for Rites and offerings,
In 2005, Académie française awarded him the Grand Award for Poetry after he was awarded the Prix Henri de Régnier in 1997 for all his work from the same Académie.
In 2006, the center of the book awarded him Poitou-Charentes book prize, for his novel In the grass.
In 2010, he received the Mallarmé prize for his book The Ordinary Time.

Works
Royaumes, poésie, Seuil, 1962.
Travaux sur la terre, poésie, Seuil, 1966.
Des Chevaux parmi les arbres, roman, Seuil, 1968 ; Champ Vallon, 1992. 
Sibylles, poésie, Paris, Galanis, 1971.
Les Vitraux de Chagall, essai, Paris, Mazo, 1972;
The stained-glass windows of Chagall 1957-1970 New York: Tudor Pub. Co., 1973, 
Pentecôte, roman, Gallimard, 1973.

Atlante, poème, Montréal, L’Hexagone, 1976 ; Toronto, Exile, 1979.

Traité du blanc et des teintures, poème, Montréal, Erta, 1978 ; Toronto, Exile, 1980.

Salamander, anthologie poétique bilingue, Princeton, Princeton University Press, 1979.
Mont-Royal, journal, Gallimard, 1981.Fleuve sans fin - Journal du Saint-Laurent, journal, Gallimard, 1986, réédition, «La petite Vermillon», La Table Ronde, 1994

Sur le motif, journal, Seyssel, Champ Vallon, 1986, Venise en miroir, Quimper, Calligrammes, 1987Vigie, Quimper, Calligrammes, 1987
Voyage au verso, Champ Vallon, 1989, Ce que corneille crie, poésie, Champ Vallon, 1989Comte de Villamediana : poésies, traduction, « Orphée »/La Différence, 1989Forestières, Paris, Métailié, 1990
Fragments de la France, Champ Vallon, 1990, Luis de Góngora, Première Solitude, traduction, « Orphée »/La Différence, 1991Le Jour qu’on a tué le cochon, roman, Champ Vallon, 1991
; Exile Editions, Ltd. 2006, Cortège pour le Corbeau, poésie, Quimper, Calligrammes, 1991
Liturgie, Champ Vallon, 1992, Huit peintres, La Table Ronde, 1994Etudes pour une muse, Champ Vallon, 1995Royaumes - Travaux sur la terre - Sibylles (réédition), « Orphée »/La Différence, 1995La Récolte de la rosée, la tradition alchimique dans la littérature, Paris, « L’Extrême contemporain », Belin, 1995Louanges, poésie, Champ Vallon, 1996

Registre, poésie, Champ Vallon, 1999, La Couleur du temps, livre d'artiste réalisé en collaboration avec le peintre Georges Badin, éditions Alin Anseew, 2001
Rites et offrandes, Champ Vallon, 2002m 
Dans l'herbe, Champ Vallon, 2006, Sur le Sable, chroniques taurines, Editions Mémoire Vivante, 2007Le Temps ordinaire, Champ Vallon, 2009, Entre Sable et Ciel, Editions Mémoire Vivante, 2010

References

External links
testimonies about Robert Marteau, website hosted by the University of Chicago.

"[Les plantes et les planètes] / [Plants and planets]", Poetry'' (October 2000).

1925 births
2011 deaths
People from Charente-Maritime
French male poets
20th-century French poets
Winners of the Prix Broquette-Gonin (literature)
20th-century French male writers